Pseudamycla dermestoidea is a species of sea snail, a marine gastropod mollusk in the family Columbellidae, the dove snails.

Description
The length of the shell varies between 5 mm and 10 mm.

The small shell is ovate, oblong, smooth and polished. The whitish, somewhat obtuse spire is composed of five or six slightly convex whorls. It is covered with small, ocellated, reddish points, forming an indistinct network. The sutures are surrounded above by a small band of alternating white and red spots, while the lower part is marked by another brown band, sometimes broken by distant white spots. The middle of the body whorl is surrounded by a subcrenulated red band, interrupted by white spots. At the base of the whorl are seen transverse striae, and a small brown band. The aperture is ovate. The thin outer lip is slightly denticulated.

Distribution
This species is endemic to Australia and occurs off Western Australia, New South Wales, South Australia, Victoria and Tasmania

References

 Lamarck, J.B.P.A. de M. 1822. Histoire naturelle des Animaux sans Vertèbres. Paris : J.B. Lamarck Vol. 7 711 pp
 Pease, W.H. 1871. Notes on the Synonymy and distribution of Marine Gastropoda. American Journal of Conchology 7: 20–25
 Tryon, G.W. 1883. Marginellidae, Olividae, Columbellidae. Manual of Conchology. Philadelphia : G.W. Tryon Vol. 5.
 Pace, S. 1902. Notes on the genus Pseudamycla, Pace. Proceedings of the Malacological Society of London 5(4): 267–269
 Wilson, B. 1994. Australian Marine Shells. Prosobranch Gastropods. Kallaroo, WA : Odyssey Publishing Vol. 2 370 pp. 
 Grove, S.J. (2015). A Guide to the Seashells and other Marine Molluscs of Tasmania

External links
 
 Molluscs of Tasmania: Pseudamycla dermestoidea
 Seashells of New South Wales:  Pseudamycla dermestoidea

Columbellidae
Gastropods of Australia
Gastropods described in 1822